Anatoli Aleksandrovich Skvortsov (born 24 November 1976) is a Ukrainian and Russian professional football coach and former player.

External links
 
 

1976 births
Living people
Sportspeople from Sevastopol
Ukrainian footballers
Association football midfielders
Ukrainian expatriate footballers
Expatriate footballers in Belarus
Expatriate footballers in Russia
Ukrainian Premier League players
FC Slavia Mozyr players
FC Chayka Sevastopol players
SC Tavriya Simferopol players
PFC Spartak Nalchik players
FC Shinnik Yaroslavl players
FC Luch Vladivostok players
FC Chernomorets Novorossiysk players
FC Sevastopol players
FC Kafa Feodosiya managers
FC TSK Simferopol managers
Russian Premier League players
Russian football managers